Dávid Verrasztó (born 22 August 1988) is a  Hungarian competitive swimmer. He competed at the 2012 and 2016 Summer Olympics, in the 200 and 400 m individual medleys. His father and coach, Zoltán Verrasztó, and his sister, Evelyn Verrasztó, are also swimmers.

In 2019, he was a member of the 2019 International Swimming League, representing Team Iron.

References

External links
 

1988 births
Living people
Hungarian male swimmers
Male medley swimmers
Swimmers from Budapest
Olympic swimmers of Hungary
Swimmers at the 2012 Summer Olympics
Swimmers at the 2016 Summer Olympics
Medalists at the FINA World Swimming Championships (25 m)
European Aquatics Championships medalists in swimming
World Aquatics Championships medalists in swimming
Swimmers at the 2020 Summer Olympics
20th-century Hungarian people
21st-century Hungarian people